La Guancha is a municipality in the northern part of the island of Tenerife, one of the Canary Islands, and part of the province of Santa Cruz de Tenerife.  It is located about 40 km west of the island's capital Santa Cruz de Tenerife, and 6 km east of Icod de los Vinos. The population is 5,448 (2013) and the area is 23.77 km².  The elevation is 501 m.

Historical population

See also
List of municipalities in Santa Cruz de Tenerife

References

External links
https://web.archive.org/web/20050831151654/http://www.aytolaguancha.com/
http://www.fuentedelaguancha.org

Municipalities in Tenerife